The Occitan Valleys are the part of Occitania (the territory of the Occitan language) within the borders of Italy.
It is a mountainous region in the southern Alps. Most of its valleys are oriented eastward and descend toward the plains of Piedmont.

The area has a population of  inhabitants (July, 2013).
Its major towns are Lo Borg Sant Dalmatz (Borgo San Dalmazzo), Buscha (Busca), Boves (Bueves) and Draonier (Dronero).

The Occitan linguistic enclave of La Gàrdia (Guardia Piemontese) in Calabria does not belong to the Occitan Valleys.

A 1999 Italian law ("Law 482") provides for the protection of linguistic minorities, including Occitan.

Communities with clear Occitan presence before the 482/99 Act

These are the villages where an autochthonous Provençal-speaking community has surely settled and may still speak the language. Around 35% of the population (stats by Enrico Allasino, IRES 2005 and IRES Piemonte no.113/2007) declared to be able to speak or understand the local Provençal language, with various levels of proficiency. Italian and Piedmontese are spoken by the majority of the people in the area, and the patois is much influenced by both the other two languages.
{| class="wikitable"
|-
! Val d'Ors !! Upper Susa Valley
|-
| Bardonescha || Bardonecchia
|-
| Cesana || Cesana Torinese
|-
| Chaumont || Chiomonte
|-
| Las Clavieras || Claviere
|-
| Exilhas || Exilles
|-
| Ols or Ors || Oulx
|-
| Salbertrand || Salbertrand
|-
| Lo Grand Sauze || Sauze di Cesana
|-
| Lo Sauze (d'Ors) || Sauze d'Oulx
|-
| La Sestriera || Sestriere
|-
! Val Cluson !! Alta Val Chisone
|-
| Finoistrèlas || Fenestrelle
|-
| Praamòl || Pramollo
|-
| Prajalats || Pragelato
|-
| Lo Rore || Roure
|-
| Usseaus || Usseaux
|-
! Val Sant MartinVal Sopata !! Val Germanasca
|-
| Pomaret || Pomaretto
|-
| Massèl || Massello
|-
| Lo Perier || Perrero
|-
| Praal || Prali
|-
| Salsa || Salza di Pinerolo
|-
! Val Pèlis !! Val Pellice
|-
| Angrònha || Angrogna
|-
| Buèbi || Bobbio Pellice
|-
| La Tor || Torre Pellice
|-
| Lo Vialar || Villar Pellice
|-
! Val Pò !! Alta Valle Po
|-
| Ostana || Ostana
|-
! Val Varacha || Val Varaita
|-
| Blins || Bellino
|-
| Chastèldalfin || Casteldelfino
|-
| Fraisse || Frassino
|-
| Lo Mèl || Melle
|-
| Pont e la Chanal || Pontechianale
|-
| Sant Pèire || Sampeyre
|-
| Valmala || Valmala
|-
| Venascha || Venasca
|-
! Val Maira !! Val Maira
|-
| Acelh || Acceglio
|-
| Cartinhan || Cartignano
|-
| Chanuelhas || Canosio
|-
| Cèlas || Celle di Macra
|-
| Elva || Elva
|-
| L'Arma || Macra
|-
| La Màrmol || Marmora
|-
| Prats || Prazzo
|-
| San Dumian || San Damiano Macra
|-
| Estròp || Stroppo
|-
! Val Grana !! Valle Grana
|-
| Chastèlmanh || Castelmagno
|-
| Montrós || Monterosso Grana
|-
| Pradievi || Pradleves
|-
! Val d'Estura !! Valle Stura
|-
| Aison || Aisone
|-
| L'Argentiera || Argentera
|-
| Demont || Demonte
|-
| Pèirapuerc || Pietraporzio
|-
| La Ròca || Roccasparvera
|-
| Sambuc || Sambuco
|-
| Vinai || Vinadio
|-
! Val Ges !! Valle Gesso
|-
| Entraigas || Entracque
|-
| Roascha || Roaschia
|-
| Vaudier || Valdieri
|-
! Val Vermenanha !! Val Vermenagna
|-
| Limon || Limone Piemonte
|-
| Robilant || Robilante
|-
| Lou Vernant || Vernante

|}

Communities whose patois community is extinct

In these communities, apart from Italian, the most widely spoken language is Piedmontese. In the past, in the lower Val Chisone, Waldensian communities were the major part of the population. Chisone, Pellice and Germanasca Valleys were referred as "Waldensian Valleys" and the local Provençal speech was called "Waldesian language", and it was opposed to the language of the Catholic population which was Piedmontese. The Lower Chisone Valley in the 20th century had a rapid industrial growth, and since then the Waldensian was replaced by Piedmontese in the most bustled villages. In Oncino and Crissolo the local patois disappeared after a dramatic depopulation.

Communities claimed to be Occitan since the 482/99 Act

These are the communities which are referred as "Occitan" in the text of the 482/99 Act, and by the agency of linguistic safeguard Chambra d'Oc, even if there was no previous source which supported this appellation. All these villages and towns lack the historical rootedness of the linguistic minority, because no linguist noticed any Occitan presence before the law.
In these cases the Provençal translation of the place name doesn't exist, or it's an exonym used by the patoisants'' of the upper valleys to indicate the lower valley settlements, or it is the transliteration in Occitan orthography of the Piedmontese/Ligurian toponym.

See also
 Baìo
 Occitan folk music
John Charles Beckwith
Luserna San Giovanni 
Val Pellice

References

Valleys of Italy
.
Valleys of the Alps
Valleys of Piedmont
Landforms of Liguria
Metropolitan City of Turin
Province of Cuneo
Geographical, historical and cultural regions of Italy
Geographical, historical and cultural regions of Piedmont